Mylabris variabilis  is a species of blister beetle belonging to the Meloidae family.

Subspecies
 Mylabris variabilis var. disrupta Baudi, 1878 
 Mylabris variabilis var. lacera Fischer von Waldheim, 1827 
 Mylabris variabilis var. mutabilis Mars 
 Mylabris variabilis var. sturmi Baudi

Distribution
This common species  is present in most of Southern Europe, from the Iberian Peninsula to southern Russia.  It can also be found in Caucaus and Transcaucasia, Near East and northern Levant, Middle East and Central Asia and Siberia.

Description

These beetles have a cylindrical, elongate body with  relatively convex, yellow-orange elytra and wide transverse black wavy stripes. Head is square shaped, with a flat forehead. Antennae are black and long with eleven segments. Pronotum is long and wide, with parallel sides. The size of the black markings and the color of elytra are very variable (hence the specie name variabilis). Normally they have three black bands. The 1st and 2nd bands are sometimes divided into four distinct spots. They are however distinguished from the similar species by a black stripe ath the end of the abdomen. This species is very similar to Mylabris pannonica Kaszab, 1956.

Biology
This species has a very complex biological cycle. Adults fly from June to September, feeding on flowers. During the larval stage they feed on eggs and larvae of grasshoppers.

Bibliography
 Heiko Bellmann (1999): Der Neue Kosmos Insektenführer. Franckh-Kosmos Verlags-GmbH & Co, Stuttgart. 
Heiko Bellmann: Insectes d'Europe, Artemis, Poche nature 2007,
Michael Chinery, Insectes de France et d'Europe occidentale, Paris, Flammarion, août 2012, 320 p., p. 276
Nikbakhtzadeh M.R., Tirgari S., 2002. Blister Beetles (Coleoptera: Meloidae) in Nahavand County (Hamedan Province, Iran) and Their Ecological Relationship to Other Coleopteran Families, Iranian J. Publ. Health, Vol. 31, Nos. 1-2, PP. 55-62.
Özbek H., Szaloki D., 1998. A contribution to the knowledge of the Meloidae (Coleoptera) fauna of Turkey along with new records, TÜBİTAK, Tr. J. of Zoology 22, 23-40.

References

External links
 Insecta.pro

Meloidae
Beetles described in 1782